Rugazi is a commune of Bubanza Province in north-western Burundi.

Communes of Burundi
Bubanza Province